The 2008 Open de Moselle was a men's tennis tournament played on indoor hard courts. It was the sixth edition of the Open de Moselle, and was part of the International Series of the 2008 ATP Tour. It took place at the Arènes de Metz in Metz, France, from September 29 through October 5, 2008.

The announced field featured ATP No. 14, Cincinnati Masters semi-finalist, two-time Nottingham champion Ivo Karlović, Casablanca, Toronto Masters semi-finalist, Indianapolis and Bucharest titlist Gilles Simon, and Costa do Sauípe, Acapulco winner Nicolás Almagro. Also lined up were Marseille and Munich semi-finalist Paul-Henri Mathieu, Sydney champion Dmitry Tursunov, Andreas Seppi, Radek Štěpánek and Mario Ančić.

Finals

Singles

 Dmitry Tursunov defeated  Paul-Henri Mathieu, 7–6(8–6), 1–6, 6–4
It was Dmitry Tursunov's 2nd title of the year, and his 5th overall.

Doubles

 Arnaud Clément /  Michaël Llodra defeated  Mariusz Fyrstenberg /  Marcin Matkowski, 5–7, 6–3, [10–8]

References

External links
Official website
Singles draw
Doubles draw

 
September 2008 sports events in France
October 2008 sports events in France